Symphony No. 7 in D major, K. 45, by Wolfgang Amadeus Mozart, was completed in Vienna in January 1768 after the family's return from a visit to Olomouc and Brno in Moravia. The symphony is in four movements. Its first performance was probably at a private concert. The symphony was reworked to become the overture to Mozart's opera, La finta semplice, K. 51, composed and performed later that year, and the overture itself was subsequently adapted further to create a new symphony, known in the Köchel 1964 (K6) catalogue as K. 46a. The autograph of the score is preserved in the Staatsbibliothek Preusischer Kulturbesitz in Berlin.

Movements and instrumentation
For the original (K. 45) version the instrumentation was: strings, 2 oboes, 2 horns, 2 trumpets, timpani, bassoon, continuo. For the symphonic overture (K. 46a) version the trumpets were replaced with flutes, an extra bassoon was added, and the timpani were excised.

Molto allegro, 
Andante, 
Menuetto and Trio,  (this movement was omitted from the "overture" version)
Molto allegro,

Performance history
According to analyst Neal Zaslaw, the first occasion on which the K. 45 version could have been heard was a concert given by Prince von Galitzin, the Russian ambassador, at his Vienna residence in late March, 1768. The K. 46b version was heard at the premiere of La finta semplice, at Salzburg on 1 May 1769.

References

Sources
 Giglberger, Veronika: (Preface), translated by J. Branford Robinson. Bärenreiter-Verlag, Kassel 2005 ISMN M-006-20466-3.
Osborne, Charles: The Complete Operas of Mozart Gollancz, London 1992 
Zaslaw, Neal: Mozart's Symphonies: Context, Performance Practice, Reception OUP, Oxford 1991

External links

07
1768 compositions
Compositions in D major